Kensington is a suburb of Adelaide, South Australia in the City of Norwood, Payneham & St Peters council area. Unlike the rest of the city, Kensington's streets are laid out diagonally. Second Creek runs through and under part of the suburb, which contains many heritage buildings as well as Norwood Swimming Pool.

History
The village of Kensington was surveyed in November 1838 by J.H. Hughes, the first in the immediate area, and was named after Kensington Palace.

First Anglican bishop Augustus Short first lived in Kensington after his arrival in December 1847, on the corner of Bishop's Place and Regent Street.

The Colonial Secretary, then Alfred Mundy, lived in Kensington in 1848. This was before the village of Marryatville was developed over the road to the south.

The Kensington line was the first of several trams in Adelaide, firstly horse-drawn (1878) and later electrified.

Location and governance
Kensington lies approximately  due east of Adelaide city centre.

Nearby suburbs Kensington Park and Beulah Park are in the City of Burnside, while Norwood and Marryatville are also in Norwood, Payneham and St Peters council area.

Schools
Marryatville Primary School is a state primary school, located in Kensington (not in Marryatville, as its name suggests), accommodating around 545 students from Reception to Year 7 . Most students go on to attend Marryatville High School, with some students zoned to Norwood/Morialta High School. The school was established in 1883 at a site on Kensington Road, and moved to its current location in 1978. The first principal was William J. Kent.

Mary MacKillop College is a private Catholic girls' secondary school located in Kensington, founded by Mary MacKillop in 1872.

A middle school STEM building for Pembroke School is located in Kensington, adjacent to the main middle school facilities in Kensington Park. The building was designed by architects Grieve Gillett Anderson and opened in 2019.

Historic buildings

The suburb contains a large number of heritage-listed buildings, mostly dwellings and a few former shops. The Norwood Swimming Pool is also listed.

The Rising Sun

The Rising Sun Hotel was established in 1846 by William Beck, a "black African" man who had previously run the Kensington Arms; the hotel was later referred to as "Black Becks". The inn occupied the premises at 64 Bridge Street from 1848 to 1882, during which the Beck family was associated with it for its first two decades; Sarah Ann Beck and then Alexander Beck held the licence following William's death. In 1858 the inn was described as ”a public house of brick, 7 rooms, bar, kitchen, stables, sheds and garden"; by 1864 it included a cellar. Edwin T. Smith, proprietor of Kent Town Brewery, bought the inn, and Benjamin Morey, who served as local councillor in 1863–64, held the licence until October 1878. Smith improved the building, adding an enclosed area at the front and fitting the interior with cedar woodwork. After Morey came William Hamlin Fairley and John Paul Dunk in 1879, followed by Henry White Newlyn in 1880.

Newlyn moved the inn to a new two-storey building on the corner of High Street in 1882, which remained as the Rising Sun Hotel until 1909, although he left proprietorship in 1885. Meetings of groups such as ratepayers and Oddfellows, as well as coronial inquests, were held at the hotel in the 1880s.

The old building, owned by Smith until 1913, was converted into three residential tenancies. It was used as a motorcycle factory from 1950 to 1972, manufacturing the only South Australian-produced motorcycles. After that the building lay derelict until it was converted into a boutique pub in 1983. It was heritage-listed on the South Australian Heritage Register as the "Rising Sun Inn" in the same year. The corner building which housed the hotel at the turn of the century was heritage-listed in 1990, as two attached shops and a residence.

The internationally renowned visual effects company, Rising Sun Pictures, took its name from the pub after its founders had their first meeting there in 1995.

In 2015 Grant Goodall took over the establishment from its previous owner of eight years, chef Tom Savis. Today it is known as simply "The Rising Sun".

References

Further reading
 Contains a great deal of detail about residents and buildings in both Kensington and Marryatville before 1923.
Much of the early history of Kensington, Marryatville and Heathpool are described in this article, which has been split into three by the scanning process on Trove:
 (Part one of single article)
 (Part two of Kensington and Marryatville article) Covers Heathpool.
 Contains details about First and Second Creeks, the streets of Kensington, Kensington Oval, the tramways, Kensington Park, etc.; continued on next page, 

Suburbs of Adelaide